McKinley Wright IV (born October 25, 1998) is an American professional basketball player for the Dallas Mavericks of the National Basketball Association (NBA), on a two-way contract with the Texas Legends of the NBA G League. He played college basketball for the Colorado Buffaloes.

Early life and high school career
Wright is the son of McKinley Wright III and grew up in Champlin, Minnesota. Wright attended Champlin Park High School and averaged 23 points, eight rebounds and seven assists per game in his senior season. He led the team to a 31–1 record and the 4A title game, losing to Apple Valley High School. Wright had 30 points in a state quarterfinal victory over Chaska High School. He was named 2017 Minnesota Mr. Basketball. He initially committed to Dayton but reopened his recruiting after coach Archie Miller was hired by Indiana. In April 2017, Wright committed to Colorado.

College career
On December 15, 2017, Wright set career highs in points (30) and assists (11) as the Buffaloes defeated South Dakota State 112–103 in double overtime. As a freshman, Wright averaged 14.2 points, 5.5 assists, and 4.7 rebounds per game on a team that finished 17–15. Wright was named to the Pac-12 Conference All-Freshman Team while earning honorable mention to both the All-Pac-12 Team and All-Defensive Team. His 175 assists broke Chauncey Billups' record of 143 assists for a freshman. After the season, he worked out with Billups to improve his jump shot. As a sophomore, Wright was named first-team All-Pac-12. Wright averaged 13 points and 4.8 assists per game despite nursing a left shoulder so tender that he slept on his back to keep it from being painful. He had corrective surgery after the season to fix a torn labrum. Wright had a season-high 29 points in a 78–76 overtime win over Dayton, receiving jeers from fans of the school he originally signed with out of high school. At the conclusion of the regular season, Wright was named to the All-Pac-12 first team and the Pac-12 All-Defensive Team. As a junior, Wright averaged 14.4 points, 5.7 rebounds and 5.0 assists per game. After the season, Wright declared for the 2020 NBA draft. On August 1, he announced he was withdrawing from the draft to return for his senior season. As a senior, he averaged 15.2 points, 4.3 rebounds, 5.7 assists and 1.1 steals per game, earning Pac-12 All-First Team honors. Following the season, Wright declared for the 2021 NBA draft forgoing his extra year of eligibility.

Professional career
After going undrafted in the 2021 NBA draft, Wright signed a two-way contract with the Minnesota Timberwolves on August 6, 2021, splitting time with their G League affiliate, the Iowa Wolves.

Wright joined the Phoenix Suns for the 2022 NBA Summer League. In September 2022, he was signed by the Dallas Mavericks. After training camp, his contract was converted to a two-way contract on October 15, 2022.

Career statistics

NBA

|-
| style="text-align:left;"| 
| style="text-align:left;"| Minnesota
| 5 || 0 || 3.8 || .667 || .500 || — || .0 || .6 || .0 || .0 || 1.0
|- class="sortbottom"
| style="text-align:center;" colspan="2"| Career
| 5 || 0 || 3.8 || .667 || .500 || — || .0 || .6 || .0 || .0 || 1.0

College

|-
| style="text-align:left;"| 2017–18
| style="text-align:left;"| Colorado
| 32 || 31 || 32.6 || .451 || .304 || .770 || 4.7 || 5.5 || 1.0 || .4 || 14.2
|-
| style="text-align:left;"| 2018–19
| style="text-align:left;"| Colorado
| 35 || 35 || 32.4 || .494 || .365 || .807 || 4.9 || 4.8 || 1.1 || .2 || 13.0
|-
| style="text-align:left;"| 2019–20
| style="text-align:left;"| Colorado
| 32 || 32 || 34.9 || .448 || .336 || .792 || 5.7 || 5.0 || 1.1 || .3 || 14.4
|-
| style="text-align:left;"| 2020–21
| style="text-align:left;"| Colorado
| 32 || 32 || 32.6 || .480 || .301 || .844 || 4.3 || 5.7 || 1.1 || .3 || 15.2
|- class="sortbottom"
| style="text-align:center;" colspan="2"| Career
| 131 || 130 || 33.1 || .467 || .328 || .803 || 4.9 || 5.2 || 1.1 || .3 || 14.2

References

External links
Colorado Buffaloes bio

1998 births
Living people
21st-century African-American sportspeople
African-American basketball players
American men's basketball players
Basketball players from Minnesota
Colorado Buffaloes men's basketball players
Dallas Mavericks players
Iowa Wolves players
Minnesota Timberwolves players
People from Champlin, Minnesota
Point guards
Sportspeople from the Minneapolis–Saint Paul metropolitan area
Undrafted National Basketball Association players
United States men's national basketball team players